The men's javelin throw at the 2019 World Para Athletics Championships was held in Dubai in November 2019.

Medalists

Detailed results

F13

F34

F38

F41

F46

F54

F57

F64

See also 
List of IPC world records in athletics

References 

javelin throw
2019 in men's athletics
Javelin throw at the World Para Athletics Championships